Dansbander is a 2006 Torgny Melins studio album, consisting of recordings of Teddybears Stockholm songs. The song "Dansbander" ("Punkrocker") was also released in 2006 single together with a Teddybears Stockholm-medley acting as B-side. The album was also released as a cassette tape.

Track listing

Charts

References 

2006 albums
Torgny Melins albums